Iter.Viator is the debut solo album of ex-Peccatum member, (and wife of Ihsahn) Ihriel. Translated from Latin "Iter Viator" literally means "road traveler".

Track listing
All Songs Written & Arranged By Ihriel.
"Chasm Blue" – 1:44
"Sanies" – 7:03
"Beautiful As Torment" – 6:38
"Death Salutes Atropos" – 5:27
"The Nudity Of Light" – 3:26
"Odi Et Amo" – 7:14
"In The Throws Of Guilt" – 11:00

Personnel

Star of Ash
Heidi S. Tveitan: Vocals, Keyboards, programming

Additional Personnel
Vegard Sverre Tveitan: Guitar on all songs except "Sanies", bass on tracks 3–7, vocals on 4 & 7.
Einar Solberg: Vocals on track 3.
Jostein Thomassen: Guitar on track 3 & 6.
Knut Aalefjær: Drums & percussion on tracks 3–6.
Kenneth Lia Solberg: Guitar on tracks 4 & 6.
Kris G. Rygg: Vocals on tracks 5 & 7.
The Star Of Ash Choir on track 7: Kaia Lia (conductor), Sanne Anundskås, Astrid Marie Lia, Inger Bronken, Elisabeth Lia, Marit Bøe, Heidi S. Tveitan, Pål Solberg, Knut Bendik Breistein, Einar Solberg, Vegard Tveitan, Kenneth Lia Solberg

Production
Produced By Heidi S. Tveitan, V. Tveitan, Tore Ylwizaker & Kris G. Rygg
Recorded, Engineered & Mixed By Kristoffer G. Rygg, Tore Ylwizaker & Ihriel
Mastered By Tom Kvalsvoll

External links
"Iter.Viator" at discogs

2002 debut albums